Filipczak is a Polish surname. Notable people with the surname include:

 Adam Filipczak (1915–1992), American basketball player
 Marek Filipczak (born 1960), Polish footballer

Polish-language surnames